Semecarpus marginata is a species of plant in the family Anacardiaceae. It is endemic to Sri Lanka.

References

Flora of Sri Lanka
marginata
Vulnerable plants
Taxonomy articles created by Polbot